Zorge may refer to:

Zorge, Walkenried, a village in Lower Saxony, Germany, today part of the municipality Walkenried
Zorge (river), of Lower Saxony and Thuringia, Germany
Zorge (Moscow Central Circle), a station on the Moscow Central Circle of the Moscow Metro